This article is about Bangladeshi clubs' performance in the Asian Club Championship which became defunct in 2002. A total of three clubs represented Bangladesh in the Asian Club Championship.

Dhaka Abahani

Results

Dhaka Mohammedan

Results

Muktijoddha Sangsad

Results

Opponents

Head-to-head records against all clubs form 31 nations whom they have played to date only in AFC Competitions.

Last Updated on 19 May 2022.

See also
 Bangladeshi clubs in the AFC Cup
 Football in Bangladesh

References

Bangladeshi football clubs in international competitions
 
Bangladeshi football club records and statistics
Football clubs in the AFC Champions League